Gmina Ruda-Huta is a rural gmina (administrative district) in Chełm County, Lublin Voivodeship, in eastern Poland, on the border with Ukraine.

Villages
Gmina Ruda-Huta contains the villages and settlements of Chromówka, Dobryłów, Gdola, Gotówka, Hniszów, Jazików, Karolinów, Leśniczówka, Poczekajka, Ruda, Ruda-Huta, Ruda-Opalin, Rudka, Żalin and Zarudnia.

Neighbouring gminas
Gmina Ruda-Huta is bordered by the gminas of Chełm, Dorohusk, Sawin and Wola Uhruska. It also borders Ukraine.

References
Polish official population figures 2006

Ruda-Huta
Gmina Ruda Huta